Ansai is a district of the city of Yan'an, Shaanxi province, China. Its postal code is 717400, and its Serial Number is 610624.

Administrative divisions 
Ansai District administers three subdistricts and eight towns.

Subdistricts 
Ansai has jurisdiction over the following 3 subdistricts:

 
 Jinming Subdistrict
 Baiping Subdistrict

Towns 
Ansai has jurisdiction over the following 8 towns:

 
 Yanhewan
 
 
 
 
 
 

Geography 
The main rivers of the district are the Yan River, the Xingzi River, the Xichuan River, the Xiaochuan River, the Xiaogou River, and the Shuangyang River.

Climate 

Economy
Ansai is a traditionally agricultural district where vegetables, livestock, apples, apricots are produced. Key natural resources in the district include oil, natural gas, iron, limestone, gypsum, kerogen and fire clay.

Culture
Ansai's cultural heritage includes typical Shanbei folk art. There is a tradition of paper-cutting, the painting of farmers, clay crafts, waist drums, and folk songs. Ansai's drum music has long been famous. A large number of folk art items are stored in the district office.

Ansai is part of the Chinese Communists base in northern Shaanxi, with several schools in the south suburb of Yan'an.

Transport 
The G65 Baomao Expressway, Shaanxi Highway 206, and Shaanxi Highway 303 pass through the district. The Yanwu Expressway, an expressway connecting Ansai District to nearby Wuqi County, begins in the town of Yanhewan in Ansai District.

In August 2012, a sleeper bus crashed into a tanker carrying methanol, killing 36 people and injuring 3.

References

External links
Agricultural Information Website
Ansai Online
District Office

Districts of Shaanxi
Yan'an